Sir Bernard William Gilbert, GCB, KBE (1891 – 7 November 1957) was a British civil servant who served as Joint Secretary in HM Treasury from 1944 to 1956.

Born in Nottingham, the son of a hosiery warehouseman, Gilbert was educated at Nottingham High School and St John's College, Cambridge. He joined HM Treasury in 1914, but his career was interrupted by military service during the First World War, during which he served with ther Royal Horse Artillery and Royal Garrison Artillery.

References

External links 

 

1891 births
1957 deaths
Knights Grand Cross of the Order of the Bath
Knights Commander of the Order of the British Empire
Civil servants in HM Treasury
People educated at Nottingham High School
Alumni of St John's College, Cambridge
British Army personnel of World War I
20th-century British civil servants